The Jacksonville Regional Transportation Center at LaVilla (JRTC) is an intermodal transit station in Jacksonville, Florida. It serves the Jacksonville Transportation Authority (JTA) bus system, the First Coast Flyer bus rapid transit (BRT) system, and the Jacksonville Skyway monorail, as well as home to JTA's administrative offices.

It is across the street form the Prime F. Osborn III Convention Center and connected to by a pedestrian bridge to the Intercity Bus Terminal which is served by Greyhound Lines, Megabus, and RedCoach.

History 
LaVilla station was one of the three original Jacksonville Skyway stops that opened with the initial  Phase I-A segment in June 1989. It was originally called "Terminal Station" in reference to the Jacksonville Terminal, a former train station that was converted into the Prime F. Osborn III Convention Center in 1986 and renamed "Convention Center" in reference to the Prime F. Osborn III Convention Center. Built to provide public transit access to the Convention Center, it is the western terminus of line, which ran east to Jefferson station and Central station. All three stations were closed for one year between December 1996 and December 1997, when the Skyway transitioned from Matra to Bombardier Transportation technology.

The station has an adjacent park and ride lot. The City of Jacksonville had long planned to incorporate the site into an intermodal transit station, with the return of rail service to the Jacksonville Terminal. In May 2017, JTA announced that the station would be closed about two months later for the construction of the Jacksonville Regional Transportation Center (JRTC).

The station reopened as part of the new Jacksonville Regional Transportation Center on May 4, 2020.

Future and proposed projects 
First Coast Commuter Rail is a proposed passenger rail system serving Jacksonville and the Northeast Florida region. It is currently in the early planning stages. Three routes were analyzed in depth: north to Yulee, Florida, southwest to Green Cove Springs, Florida, and southeast to St. Augustine, Florida.

Brightline is an inter-city passenger rail system between Miami and West Palm Beach with an under-construction extension to Orlando. Jacksonville is a likely expansion point for the near future, as the FEC Railway already owns the tracks running there.

References 

Jacksonville Skyway stations
Railway stations in the United States opened in 1989
Transportation in Jacksonville, Florida
Bus stations in Florida
1989 establishments in Florida